Claudia Lumor (born 17 June 1980) is a Ghanaian Publisher, founder of Glitz Africa Magazine and the Glitz Style Awards. She is also the Executive Producer of Glitz Africa Fashion Week Ghana.

Education 
Lumor is a graduate of Kwame Nkrumah University with a B.A in Economics and Law. She also studied Corporate Finance Law at Westminster Law School in London.

Career 
She worked at Santander Bank UK and later moved to Ghana to work with Stanbic Bank in 2010. Lumor was named amongst the speakers of WomanRising, a network for women entrepreneurs. The event featured five women in entrepreneurship: Kafui Danku, Deloris Frimpong Manso, Ekow Mensah, Vera Osei-Bonsu and Cynthia Quarcoo. She was included in the list of 50 young Chief executive officers in Ghana by Avance Media and The YCEO. She is a Goodwill Ambassador for the UNFPA.

Recognition 
 Young creative entrepreneur of the year - British Council Fashion And Design 2015
 Start up and Entrepreneur of the year - Ghana Startup Awards 2017
 100 most Influential women in Ghana

References 

1980 births
Living people
Alumni of the University of Westminster
Ghanaian producers
Ghanaian publishers (people)
Kwame Nkrumah University of Science and Technology alumni